was a sumo wrestler from Osaka Prefecture, Japan. He began his career in 1961, reaching the top makuuchi division in 1966. His highest rank was ōzeki which he held from 1970 until 1972. He retired in 1974 and became head coach of the Takadagawa stable. He left the Sumo Association in 2010 upon turning 65.

Career
He was born in Niwakubo Town in Kitakawachi-un, Osaka Prefecture (the town has now been incorporated into Moriguchi City), and was of Korean descent. He entered Takasago stable and made his professional debut in March 1961. He reached sekitori status in November 1965 upon promotion to the jūryō division and reached the top makuuchi division in September 1966. He made his san'yaku debut in March 1968 at sekiwake. In May 1969 he defeated yokozuna Kashiwado on opening day and went on to win 11 bouts, receiving his first sanshō or special prize, for Fighting Spirit. He was promoted to sumo's second highest rank of ōzeki in July 1970 after two consecutive runner-up performances to yokozuna Kitanofuji, the second coming in a play-off. His ōzeki debut in September 1970 was inauspicious as he had injured his right foot in training and had to miss the entire tournament through injury. He returned in November to score 9–6 and keep his rank, but the foot injury continued to trouble him, and he was unable to win more than nine bouts in any of his ten tournaments at ōzeki rank. He was demoted from ōzeki in March 1972 after two consecutive losing scores. His Day 12 win over Kotozakura in this tournament was criticized by the Japan Sumo Association as being an example of mukiryoku or "unmotivated" sumo, a euphemism for yaocho or match-fixing, as his fellow ōzeki opponent had shown little resistance. It was unprecedented for the Sumo Association to publicly warn wrestlers in this way. Maenoyama withdrew after this bout and his resulting 6–7–2 record confirmed his demotion. He would have been promoted back to ōzeki if he had won at least ten bouts in the following tournament, but he scored only 7–8. He continued to compete in the lower ranks until March 1974, when he announced his retirement from active competition at the age of 29.

Retirement from sumo
He became an elder of the Japan Sumo Association under the name Takadagawa and established the Takadagawa stable in April 1974. He produced such top division wrestlers as komusubi Maenoshin and Kenko, and maegashira Kiraiho. It was once part of the Takasago ichimon (group of stables). However, the stable became a pariah after Takadagawa ran for the leadership of the Sumo Association in 1998 against the wishes of the Takasago ichimon. As a result, he was forced to leave the Takasago camp. There was some belief that he would join the Dewanoumi group but instead the stable went independent. In December 2008 it was announced that former sekiwake Akinoshima would be his successor. Takadagawa stood down in August 2009 to ease the transition. The two swapped elder names, and he became Sendagawa Oyakata. He left the Japan Sumo Association in March 2010 upon reaching the mandatory retirement age of 65. He died of multiple organ failure on 11 March 2021 at the age of 76. After the family funeral was held, the Japan Sumo Association announced his death on 29 March.

Fighting style
Maenoyama's favourite techniques were tsukidashi (thrust out), hidari-yotsu (a right hand outside, left hand inside grip on his opponent's mawashi) and yorikiri (force out).

Career record

See also
Glossary of sumo terms
List of sumo tournament top division runners-up
List of sumo tournament second division champions
List of past sumo wrestlers
List of ōzeki

References

1945 births
2021 deaths
Japanese sumo wrestlers
People from Moriguchi, Osaka
Sumo people from Osaka Prefecture
Zainichi Korean people
Ōzeki